Sidner is a surname. Notable people with this surname include:
 (1815–1869), Swedish musician
 (1788–1852), Swedish priest
Candace Sidner, American computer scientist
 (1852–1929), Swedish teacher
 (1851–1917), Swedish military officer
Sara Sidner (born 1972), American journalist